Babasaheb Bhimrao Ambedkar Bihar University, formerly Bihar University, popularly known as Dr. B. R. Ambedkar Bihar University (BRABU), is a public university located in Muzaffarpur, Bihar, India. Established in 1960, the university has 38 constituent colleges and 40 affiliated colleges. It offers education from undergraduate to postgraduate and research level, as well as  Distance education. It is named after B. R. Ambedkar, social reformer and the architect of Indian Constitution.

History 
The University of Bihar was established in 1952 through the University of Bihar Act, 1951, which split the Patna University, giving jurisdiction over all colleges situated outside the municipal limits of Patna to the newly formed university, which was still headquartered from Patna. In 1960, the Bihar State Universities (Patna, University of Bihar, Bhagalpuir and Ranchi) Act, 1960 changed the division of universities in the states giving jurisdiction over the Patna division to Patna University, and dividing the rest of the state jurisdiction between three universities, University of Bihar, with headquarters at Muzaffarpur, with jurisdiction over Tirhut division, Bhagalpur University with jurisdiction over Bhagalpur division, and Ranchi University with jurisdiction over Chotanagpur division (present day Jharkhand). The university was further bifurcated in 1962, through the Bihar University Act, 1961, creating Magadh University with jurisdiction over Magadh division, in 1972 through an ordinance, creating Mithila University, which was given jurisdiction over colleges from the Darbhanga and Kosi divisions, and finally in 1990, creating Jai Prakash University with jurisdiction over Saran division. In 1992 the university was renamed Babasaheb Bhimrao Ambedkar Bihar University, after B. R. Ambedkar.

Colleges
Its jurisdiction extends over the six districts of Tirhut division. , the university has 38 constituent colleges and 40 affiliated colleges. The constituent colleges are:
 Langat Singh College
 Mahant Darshan Das Mahila College 
R.D.S. College, Muzaffarpur
 Dr. R.M.L.S. College, Muzaffarpur
 M.P. Sinha Science College, Muzaffarpur
R.B.B.M. College, Muzaffarpur]
 Nitishwar Singh College, Muzaffarpur
 Rameshwar Singh College, Muzaffarpur
 L.N.T.College, Muzaffarpur
 M.S.K.B. College, Muzaffarpur
 Jiwachh College, Motipur, Muzaffarpur
 R.C. College, Muzaffarpur
 S.R.P.S. College, Muzaffarpur
 R.N College, Hajipur, Vaishali
 Vaishali Mahila College, Hajipur, Vaishali
 Jamuni Lal College, Hajipur, Vaishali
 D.C. College, Hajipur, Vaishali
 L.N. College, Vaishali
 Samta College, Vaishali
 B.M.D. College, Hajipur, Vaishali
 S.R.K.G. College, Sitamarhi 
 S.L.K. College, Sitamarhi
 R.S.S. Science College, Sitamarhi
 R.S.S. Mahila College, Sitamarhi
 J.S. College, Sitamarhi
 M.S. College, East Champaran
 Dr. S.K. Sinha Women's College, East Champaran
 S.N.S. College,  Hajipur 
 L.N.D. College, East Champaran
 M.S.S.G. College, East Champaran
 S.R.A.P. College, East Champaran
 K.C.T.C. College, East Champaran
 M.J.K. College, West Champaran
 RLSY College Bettiah, Bettiah West Champaran
 T.P. Verma College, West Champaran
 C.N. College, Sahebganj, Muzaffarpur
 J.B.S.D. College, Bakuchi
 R.P.S. College, Chakeyaj, Vaishali

Alumni

Bandana Kumari
Ajit Anjum
Sanjeev K Jha
Mridula Sinha
Renu Devi
Radha Mohan Singh
Arjun Roy
Rama Devi
Ritu Jaiswal
Ajay Nishad
Rama Kishore Singh
Upendra Kushwaha
Umadhar Singh
Ravindra Prabhat
Nayab Singh
Renu C. Laskar
Abdul Hakeem Azhari
Shamim Ahmad
Nutan Thakur- Lucknow based social and political activist

References

External links

 
1960 establishments in Bihar
Educational institutions established in 1960
Universities and colleges in Muzaffarpur
Universities in Bihar